Alfred William Benn (1843–1915) was an agnostic and an honorary associate of the Rationalist Press Association.  His book A History of Modern Philosophy (first published in 1912) was republished in the Thinker's Library series in 1930.

He was the author of The Greek Philosophers (2 vols, 1882); The History of English Rationalism in the Nineteenth Century (2 vols, 1906); and The History of Ancient and Modern Philosophy (2 vols, 1912).

Benn was also a member of the London Positivist Society and a friend of the lawyer and positivist Vernon Lushington. Lushington's daughter Susan recorded in her diary on 3 September 1889 that Benn and his wife visited the Lushington's Surrey home - Pyports, Cobham - and how Mrs Benn told her "how she came to be a positivist."

References
Obituary: Alfred William Benn, International Journal of Ethics, Vol. 26, No. 2 (Jan., 1916), pp. 282–283
Obituary: A. W. Benn, R. G. Bury, The Classical Review, Vol. 30, No. 2 (Mar., 1916), p. 63

External links
 
 
 

1843 births
1915 deaths
19th-century philosophers
20th-century British philosophers
English agnostics
English philosophers
Freethought writers